Marietta Square, also called Glover Park, is a park and traditional city center in Marietta, Georgia, United States.

History
When the Cobb County courthouse burned in 1848, Mayor John Glover donated the land to the city on the condition that it would stay a park or return to its heirs. Since then, the new courthouse has moved to its existing location, across the street from the southeast corner of the park. During the Civil War, the park was used as a training ground for the militia. On the north end of the park, a well provided water to parched men and women with a trough for horses. In the early 1900s the Atlanta trolley system was extended to Marietta and the trolley would turn around by circling the park. There was a maintenance shed across the street from the northeast corner.

Photos

References

External links

 https://web.archive.org/web/20080610190653/http://www.mariettasquare.com/index.html
 http://www.eventsonthesquare.com/ 
 https://web.archive.org/web/20060929144840/http://www.mariettaga.gov/departments/parks_rec/parks/gloverpark.aspx

Marietta, Georgia
Parks in Georgia (U.S. state)
Protected areas of Cobb County, Georgia